Martinsburg Township may refer to the following townships in the United States:

 Martinsburg Township, Renville County, Minnesota
 Martinsburg Township, Pike County, Illinois